Weis, German surname, a spelling variant of Weiss, may refer to:

 Al Weis (b. 1938), baseball player
 Charlie Weis, American football coach
 Danny Weis, American guitarist for Iron Butterfly and Rhinoceros
 Dominique Weis, Canadian scientist
 Frédéric Weis (b. 1977), French basketball player
 Heinz Weis (b. 1963), German athlete
 Indira Weis (b. 1979), German actress and singer
 John Ellsworth Weis (1892-1962), American painter  
 Joseph F. Weis, Jr., American judge
 Margaret Weis (b. 1948), American writer
 Melissa Weis (b. 1971), American discus thrower
 Petra Weis (b. 1957), German politician
 Samuel Washington Weis (1870-1956), American painter 

German-language surnames